Merliida is an order of demosponges in the subclass Heteroscleromorpha, first described as such by Jean Vacelet in 1979.

References

External links 
 

Heteroscleromorpha
Sponge orders
Taxa named by Jean Vacelet